Passaloecus monilicornis   is a Palearctic species of solitary wasp.

References

External links
Images representing Passaloecus monilicornis   

Hymenoptera of Europe
Crabronidae
Insects described in 1842